Sonaga (Xinfeng Yi 新峰彝) is a recently discovered Loloish language of Heqing County, Yunnan, China. Sonaga is spoken in Dongdeng 东登 of Xinfeng Village 新峰村 (as well as Anle Village 安乐村), Caohai Township 草海乡, Heqing County (Castro, et al. 2010).

References

Loloish languages